The 2007–08 Serbian League East season was the fifth season of the league under its current title. It began in August 2007 and ended in May 2008.

League table

Playoffs

External links
 Football Association of Serbia
 Football Association of East Serbia

Serbian League East seasons
3
Serbia